Construction of the Cheyenne Mountain Complex began with the excavation of Cheyenne Mountain in Colorado Springs, Colorado on May 18, 1961. It was made fully operational on February 6, 1967. It is a military installation and hardened nuclear bunker from which the North American Aerospace Defense Command was headquartered at the Cheyenne Mountain Complex. The United States Air Force has had a presence at the complex since the beginning, the facility is now the Cheyenne Mountain Space Force Station, which hosts other military units, including NORAD.

Initial planning
From the beginning of the Cold War, American defense experts and political leaders began planning and implementing a defensive air shield, which they believed was necessary to defend against a possible attack by long-range, manned Soviet bombers. The Air Defense Command was transferred to Colorado Springs' Ent Air Force Base on January 8, 1951. Starting September 1953, the base was the headquarters for the U.S. Army Anti-Aircraft Command.

The North American Air Defense Command (NORAD) was established and activated at the Ent Air Force Base on September 12, 1957. In the late 1950s, a plan was developed to construct a command and control center in a hardened facility as a Cold War defensive strategy against long-range Soviet bombers, ballistic missiles, and a nuclear attack.

The Operational Research Society published scientific articles at that time, relating to the planning of such a complex, like:

Hankin, B. D. "Communication and Control of Military Forces." Journal of the Operational Research Society 4.4 (1953): 65-68.

Rivett, Berwyn Hugh Patrick. "Underground communications." Journal of the Operational Research Society 4.4 (1953): 61-65.

Eddison, R. T., and D. G. Owen. "Discharging iron ore." Journal of the Operational Research Society 4.3 (1953): 39-50.

It is also interesting to note, that of the commissions charged with the task of investigating these concerns some were based around the Colorado Springs area, near the Broadmoor hotel. The leader of these inquests, members of the Rockefeller family, were also present at its inauguration. 

Psychological planning, (known as Aviation Medicine) went into the selection of candidates, which was also related to continuity of government defense programs such as Operation Looking Glass. This is also the same year the MKULTRA program was authorized. 

This planning occurred simultaneously with the rollout of Civil Defense programs in 1951, which resulted in the passage of the National Defense Education Act in 1958.

Hardened bunkers were part of a national plan to ensure the continuation of the United States government in the event of nuclear attack. In the Washington, D.C. area alone, there are said to have been 96 hardened bunkers. Other command bunkers built in the 1950s and early 1960s, include Raven Rock Mountain Complex (1953), Mount Weather Emergency Operations Center (1959) in Virginia, and Project Greek Island (Greenbrier). The closest Russian counterpart to the facility is regarded to be Kosvinsky Mountain, finished in early 1996.

Excavation 

The operations center was moved from an above-ground facility, vulnerable to attack, to the "granite shielded security" within Cheyenne Mountain during the Cold War. In terms of telecommunications capabilities, American Telephone and Telegraph (AT&T) had begun placing its switching stations in hardened underground bunkers during the 1950s.

The mountain was excavated under the supervision of the Army Corps of Engineers for the construction of the NORAD Combat Operations Center. Excavation began for NORAD Command Operations Center (COC) in Cheyenne Mountain on May 18, 1961, by Utah Construction & Mining Company. Clifton W. Livingston of the Colorado School of Mines was hired by the Army Corps of Engineers to consult upon use of controlled blasting for smooth-wall blasting techniques.

The official ground breaking ceremony was held June 16, 1961 at the construction site of the new NORAD Combat Operations Center. Generals Lee (ADC) and Laurence S. Kuter (NORAD) simultaneously set off symbolic dynamite charges. On December 20, 1961, with excavation 53% complete there were 200 workers that walked off on what Cecil Welton, Utah Construction Company project manager, called a wildcat strike after a worker was fired for disobeying safety rules. Workers returned three days later and the fired worker was returned to his position.

Excavation was nearly complete in August 1962, but a geological fault in the ceiling of one of the intersections needed to be reinforced with a $2.7 million massive concrete dome. President John F. Kennedy visited NORAD at the Chidlaw Building on June 5, 1963, to obtain a briefing on the status of the Cheyenne Mountain Complex. Excavation was complete on May 1, 1964.

On September 24, 1964, the Secretary of Defense approved the proposal for the underground Combat Operations Center construction and the Space Defense Center. The targeted date for turnover of the military-staffed facility to the Commander of NORAD was January 1, 1966.

Construction 
The architectural design was primarily created by Parsons Brinckerhoff Company. Estimated cost of the combat operations center construction and equipment was $66 million. The complex was built in the mid-1960s.

Eight three-story buildings were built in the main chambers and three two-story buildings were constructed in the support area. Grafe-Wallace, Inc. and J. M. Foster Co. received a joint contract in April 1964 for $7,212,033 contract for blast-control equipment and utilities installation, including the original six 956-kilowatt diesel powered generators. Continental Consolidated also excavated water and fuel oil reservoirs within the interior of the Cheyenne Mountain facility. Continental Consolidated was paid an additional $106,000 for work on the reservoirs.

Beginning in 1965, the NORAD Combat Operations Center was connected through several remote locations to the national telecommunications systems via Bell Laboratories' Close-in Automatic Route Restoral System (CARRS), a "Blast-resistant" communication system constructed hundreds of feet underneath solid granite. Having several remote locations, from 30 to 120 miles from the Cheyenne Mountain Complex, allowed for several different, automatically rerouted pathways to relay data, teletype, and voice communications. The Ballistic Missile Early Warning System (BMEWS) and Distant Early Warning Line (DEW) sites in North America, United Kingdom, and Greenland sent incoming information through the system to the Combat Operations Center.

Systems installations 
Burroughs Corporation developed a command and control system for NORAD's Combat Operations Center for the underground facility and the Federal Building in downtown Colorado Springs. The electronics and communications system centralized and automated the instantaneous (one-millionth of a second) evaluation of aerospace surveillance data. The Air Defense Command's SPACETRACK Center and NORAD's Space Detection and Tracking System (SPADATS) Center merged to form the Space Defense Center. It was moved from Ent AFB to the newly completed Cheyenne Mountain Combat Operations Center and was activated on September 3, 1965. The Electronic Systems Division (ESD) turned the facility's Combat Operations Center over to NORAD on January 1, 1966. The Commander of NORAD transferred Combat Operations Center operations from Ent Air Force Base to Cheyenne Mountain and declared the 425L command and control system fully operational April 20, 1966. The Space Defense Command's 1st Aerospace Control Squadron moved from Ent AFB to Cheyenne Mountain in April 1966. 

On May 20, 1966, the NORAD Attack Warning System became operational. The Combat Operations Command was fully operational on July 1, 1966.  The $5 million Delta I computer system, one of the largest computer program systems of the Electronic Systems Division, became operational on October 28, 1966. With 53 different programs, it was a defense against space systems by detecting and warning of space threats, which involved recording and monitoring every detected space system. By January 4, 1967, the National Civil Defense Warning Center was in the bunker.  The Space Defense Center and the Combat Operations Center achieved Full Operational Capability on February 6, 1967. The total cost was $142.4 million or $1,075,017,676.65 in 2018 value.

Notes

See also
 Fortification
 Underground construction

References

External links

United States Army Corps of Engineers
Government buildings completed in 1965
Cheyenne Mountain Complex
Military history of Colorado
North American Aerospace Defense Command
Nuclear bunkers in the United States
Continuity of government in the United States
Underground construction